Anton "Skip" Rimsza (born March 31, 1955, in Chicago, Illinois) is an American politician and was a mayor of Phoenix, Arizona from 1994 to 2004.

Biography 
Skip Rimsza was born March 31, 1955 in Chicago, Illinois. His parents were Anton Vincent Rimsza and Elizabeth Marie Rimsza, born Kenny. He was the 4th of 8 children.  His family moved to Phoenix shortly after his birth. He attended Camelback High School and Phoenix College. He worked as a realtor in his father's company Tony Rimsza Realty prior to his election as mayor. Skip is an avid hunter and fisherman. He has 5 children: Brian, Jennifer, Nicole, Taylor and Alex.  He was sworn in as mayor on November 4, 1994, following a special election held on October 25 to replace outgoing interim mayor Thelda Williams.  Rimsza won reelection to a full term the following year during normal elections on October 3, and a second term on September 7, 1999.  Limited to two full terms, Rimsza left office on January 2, 2004.

References 

1955 births
Living people
Mayors of Phoenix, Arizona
Arizona Republicans